Femejism is the second studio album by American rock duo Deap Vally. It was released in September 2016 by Nevado Music. The album was produced by Yeah Yeah Yeahs' guitarist Nick Zinner. He makes an appearance in the video for the first single, "Royal Jelly", which also featured the British model Georgia May Jagger.

Promotion
Music videos were produced and released for all but three songs on the album. The first of which was Royal Jelly, and it was published on Nov 10, 2015. Over the next two and a half years, Deap Vally debuted music videos for Smile More, Gonnawanna, Little Baby Beauty Queen, Critic, Julian, Turn It Off, Two Seat Bike, Post Funk and Grunge Bond. In the Gonnawanna video, fellow Los-Angeles musician Kiran Gandhi was featured.

Track listing

Personnel
 Alex Deyoung – mastering
 Nathanial Eras – percussion 
 Charles Godfrey – engineer 
 Chris Kasych – engineer
 Samur Khouja – engineer
 Lauren Fay Levy – percussion
 Rachel McCollum – artwork, design, photography
 Lars Stalfors – mixing
 John Stavas – photography 
 Deap Vally – producer 
 Sadaharu Yagi – engineer
 Nick Zinner – producer

Charts

References

2016 albums
Deap Vally albums
Island Records albums